The 2000 United States House of Representatives elections in Oklahoma were held on November 7, 2000, to elect the six U.S. representatives from the state of Oklahoma, one from each of the state's six congressional districts. The elections coincided with the 2000 U.S. presidential election, as well as other elections to the House of Representatives, elections to the United States Senate and various state and local elections.

Overview

District 1

The 1st congressional district encompassed the entirety of Tulsa County as well as western Wagoner County. This included the city of Tulsa and all of the Tulsa County suburbs in addition to Broken Arrow and vicinity. Steve Largent won reelection to a fourth term in office with 69.3% of the vote.

District 2

The 2nd congressional district encompassed most of northeastern Oklahoma with the exception of northern Osage County, Tulsa County, Wagoner County, and Washington County. Outgoing Republican Representative Tom Coburn was replaced by Democrat Brad Carson, who won 54.9% of the vote.

District 3

The 3rd congressional district encompassed most of southeastern Oklahoma in addition to a tendril of counties extending from Seminole County to most of Pawnee County. Incumbent Republican Wes Watkins won election to a 13th term in office with 86.6% of the vote. The seat was uncontested by the Democratic Party this cycle.

District 4

The 4th congressional district encompassed an area extending from the southern Oklahoma City metropolitan area to southwestern Oklahoma. Incumbent Republican J.C. Watts won reelection with 64.9% of the vote, securing a fourth term in office.

District 5

The 5th congressional district encompassed an area containing the western Canadian County, western, northern, and eastern Oklahoma County, and a line of counties extending from the northern Oklahoma City suburbs to the northern border and from there to Washington County, including Bartlesville. Incumbent Republican Ernest Istook won reelection with 68.4% of the vote, securing a fifth term in office.

District 6

The 6th congressional district broadly encompassed most of western Oklahoma in addition to a Democratic-leaning portion of interior Oklahoma County. Incumbent Republican Frank Lucas won reelection with 59.3% of the vote, winning a fourth term in office.

References

2000
Oklahoma
United States House of Representatives